The 2011 Honolulu Challenger was a professional tennis tournament played on hard courts. It was the second edition of the tournament which is part of the 2011 ATP Challenger Tour. It took place in Honolulu, United States between 24 and 30 January 2011.

Singles main-draw entrants

Seeds

 Rankings are as of January 17, 2011.

Other entrants
The following players received wildcards into the singles main draw:
  Devin Britton
  Austin Krajicek
  Dennis Lajola
  Jérémy Tweedt

The following players received entry from the qualifying draw:
  Chen Ti
  Luka Gregorc
  Jun Woong-sun
  Olivier Sajous

Champions

Singles

 Ryan Harrison def.  Alex Kuznetsov, 6–4, 3–6, 6–4

Doubles

 Ryan Harrison /  Travis Rettenmaier def.  Robert Kendrick /  Alex Kuznetsov, walkover

External links
Official Website 
ITF Search 
ATP official site

Honolulu Challenger
Hard court tennis tournaments in the United States
ATP Challengers in Hawaii
Honolulu Challenger
Honolulu Challenger
Honolulu Challenger